Hongshan Forest Zoo is a zoological park in Nanjing, the capital city of Jiangsu province, China. Located on 168 Heyan Road in the northern section of Nanjing city, it is a  park and forest with 280 kinds of animals.

History 

Hongshan Forest Zoo was founded in 1998 by combining the former Xuanwu Lake Zoo and Hongshan Park. Starting in 1928 the Nationalist government in Nanjing had a zoo of birds, monkeys, bears and other animals north of Xuanwu Lake.

Present 
The zoo consists of Xiaohongshan bird region, Dahongshan beast region, Fangniushan herbivore and Primate animal region, and an amphibian and reptile hall. There are 280 species among the 3000 animals in the zoo. There are protected animals such as Asian elephant, giraffe, zebra, kangaroo, white tiger, panther, orangutan, mandrill, flamingo, macaw parrots, gold python and so on. The first degree protected species from China at the zoo include giant panda, golden monkey, gibbon, red-crowned crane, northeast tiger, and Yangtze alligator. Animal performances are conducted daily.

Transportation
The zoo is accessible from Hongshan Zoo Station of Nanjing Metro.

References

External links

Zoos in China
Buildings and structures in Nanjing
Tourist attractions in Nanjing
Parks in Nanjing
Zoos established in 1998